Unprecedented is a 2022 American-British documentary television miniseries revolving around the 2020 US presidential election, which premiered on July 10, 2022, on Discovery+.

Plot
The documentary series includes previously unreleased footage of the Trump family on the campaign trail and their reactions to the outcome of the election. The Trumps did not request contractual right of control. It is said to offer intimate and unprecedented interviews with Trump, his family and others who were in the White House. The documentary series follows the last months of the presidency of Donald Trump. The series is shown in three parts and features interviews with President Donald Trump, Ivanka Trump, Donald Trump Jr., Jared Kushner, Eric Trump, and Vice President Mike Pence. Footage was recorded at the White House, at Trump's Mar-a-Lago residence, and events of the Trump's presidential re-election campaign.

The events of the attack on the United States Capitol on January 6, 2021, from the White House were filmed by Holder.

According to Holder, the idea behind the film was to find out who the Trumps were by way of the re-election campaign, and it ended up documenting the family’s “Succession-type vibe”.

Interviewed
Donald Trump, the 45th president of the United States
Donald Trump Jr., the eldest child of Donald Trump
Ivanka Trump, the first daughter of Donald Trump
Eric Trump, the second son of Donald Trump
Mike Pence, the 48th vice president of the United States
Jared Kushner, a senior advisor to 45th U.S. president
Anne Applebaum, a journalist and historian
Peter Baker, a journalist and author
Gwenda Blair, a biographer of Trump's family
McKay Coppins, a journalist
Marc Fisher, a senior editor for The Washington Post
Eddie Glaude, an academic
Tess Owen, a reporter
Philip Rucker, a reporter
Paola Ramos, a journalist

Production
Holder worked on a movie about Donald Trump’s 2020 re-election campaign and the aftermath for about two years.

The footage was shot at the White House, Trump's Mar-A-Lago resort and on the campaign trail during the last months of the Trump presidency. It also includes a full view of the riot at the Capitol on January 6, 2021. It was recorded for the documentary series in the last weeks of 2020 and the first weeks of 2021.

Release
The film was released in the United States on July 10, 2022. It premiered in Australia on July 11 and in Germany on July 15.

In interview to The Hollywood Reporter, the director mentioned he now has security guards:

Episodes

Subpoenas
On June 15, 2022, Holder was subpoenaed by the United States House Select Committee on the January 6 Attack, for raw footage "from January 6", from "interviews from September 2020 to present with Donald Trump, Pence, Donald Trump Jr., Ivanka Trump, Eric Trump, and Jared Kushner", and "pertaining to discussions of election fraud or election integrity surrounding the November 2020 presidential election". Holder complied with a subpoena from the committee and testified behind closed doors. Holder also complied with a subpoena for Fulton County, Georgia's criminal investigation into Trump's attempts to overturn the election in Georgia.

References

External links

'Unprecedented': 7 Biggest Takeaways – TheWrap

2020s American documentary television series
Documentary television series about politics
Media about the Trump presidency
Television series based on actual events
Films about American politicians
Television series about presidents of the United States
Films about Donald Trump